Aaja Chemnitz Arnatsiaq Larsen (born 2 December 1977 in Nuuk) is a Greenlandic politician, who is a member of the Danish Folketing for the Inuit Ataqatigiit, representing one of the two parliament seats for Greenland.

Education and civil career
Aaja Chemnitz Larsen studied Master of Science (MSc) in Business Economics and Auditing at the University of Greenland and has an Executive management degree from INSEAD. Aaja has since the election to Inatsisartut (Greenlandic parliament) in November 2014 been a member of Inatsisartut which she took a leave from due to the work at the Folketing. In the period from 2012 to 2015 she was Greenland's children spokesman for MIO – National Advocacy for Children's Rights in Greenland. In the period 2009-2012 has she was the director of the Welfare Department in Municipality of Sermersooq and been head of the social department in the years 2007–2009. Right Until 2009 she was employed as an Associate Expert of the United Nations in New York City in the Division of Social and Economic Affairs, and here working with indigenous peoples' rights.

Political career
Chemnitz Larsen was elected into the Inatsisartut at the 2014 Greenlandic general election, but decided to not run again in the following election in 2018, having been elected into the Folketing at the 2015 Folketing election. She was reelected into the Folketing in 2019.

In 2019, Chemnitz Larsen presented a plan focused on early prevention of sexual abuse of children, a growing problem in Greenland. The plan requested funding and support from Denmark to support efforts. The plan was approved, with Denmark agreeing to provide 80 million DKK and Greenland providing 20 million DKK to fund efforts.

Independence of Greenland
Chemnitz Laren supports Greenlandic independence, however, she does not believe that independence is easy to achieve and that it will happen in the near future.

References

External links
 Biography on the website of the Danish Parliament (Folketinget)

1977 births
Living people
People from Nuuk
Greenlandic Inuit people
Greenlandic people of Danish descent
Women members of the Parliament of Greenland
Members of the Parliament of Greenland
Inuit Ataqatigiit politicians
INSEAD alumni
University of Greenland alumni
21st-century Greenlandic politicians
21st-century Danish women politicians
Women members of the Folketing
Greenlandic members of the Folketing
Members of the Folketing 2015–2019
Members of the Folketing 2019–2022
Members of the Folketing 2022–2026